Phellodendrine is an alkaloid isolated originally from Phellodendron amurense (Rutaceae).

See also
 Berberine
 Jatrorrhizine
 Palmatine

References

Benzylisoquinoline alkaloids
Quaternary ammonium compounds
Phenol ethers
Isoquinolinoisoquinolines
Phenols